Mauricio Carlos de Onís y Mercklein (17 September 1790, in Dresden, Kingdom of Saxony – 24 November 1861, in Cantalapiedra, Spain) was a Spanish politician and diplomat who served as Minister of State in 1840 and as President of the Congress of Deputies.

Mauricio was son of Luis de Onís y González-Vara, an important diplomat who signed the Adams-Onís Treaty with the United States in 1819, and of Federika Christina von Mercklein. He married in Cantalapiedra, 11 December 1816, his first cousin Carolina de Onís, and had issue.

References

Mauricio Carlos de Onís. Spanish Senate
 

|-

Foreign ministers of Spain
Presidents of the Congress of Deputies (Spain)
Spanish people of German descent
1790 births
1861 deaths
Presidents of the Senate of Spain